Willington Dovecote & Stables is a National Trust property located in Willington, near Bedford, Bedfordshire, England. Both buildings are Grade I listed.

The property is a 16th-century stable and stone dovecote, which contains nesting boxes for over 1500 pigeons.

The dovecote and stables themselves were commissioned by Sir John Gostwick. Completed in around 1541, they were made from the remains of a manorial complex, and include stones most likely taken from local priories, in particular Newnham Priory, after the Dissolution of the Monasteries.

A signature on the stone above the fireplace in the stables reads "John Bunyan", but its authenticity has not been proven.

References

External links
Willington Dovecote & Stables information at the National Trust

National Trust properties in Bedfordshire
Grade I listed buildings in Bedfordshire
Stables